Limpapeh bridge is a bridge in over Ahmad Yani street, Bukittinggi, West Sumatra, Indonesia. Fort de Kock fortification is connected to the Bukittinggi zoo by this bridge.

References 

Bridges in Indonesia
Buildings and structures in West Sumatra
Transport in West Sumatra